Malcolm Riley (born 9 June 1960) is a British composer and author most associated for his work as a scholar of the work of Percy Whitlock.

Early life and education
Riley was born in Northallerton, North Riding of Yorkshire, England. Educated at Harrogate High School, he gained an organ scholarship to Christ's College, Cambridge.

Career 
Riley's composition, De Temporibus Canticum ('Of the Seasons We Sing'), was commissioned by Cranbrook Choral Society to celebrate the Millennium and gave its first performance in December 2000. Riley was also commissioned to write a celebratory piece to open Maidstone Symphony Orchestra's 100th season, titled "Fairmeadow – An Overture for Maidstone", first performed on 16 October 2010. He has performed at York Minster, Leeds Parish Church, Derby Cathedral, Bridlington Priory and Birmingham Town Hall.

He was Director of Music at Cranbrook School from 1985 to December 2011.

Riley is also the author of two books concerning organist and composer Percy Whitlock. His first, "Percy Whitlock - A Biographical Study" was published to critical acclaim, as was the "Percy Whitlock Companion", a collection of letters and diary extracts of the early 20th-century composer.

He left Invicta Grammar School in Maidstone in July 2017, after five years as the leader of the Music Department.

References

1960 births
Living people
20th-century classical composers
21st-century classical composers
English classical composers
People from Northallerton
English male classical composers
20th-century English composers
20th-century British male musicians
20th-century British musicians
21st-century British male musicians